The Coming of the Padres is a 1914 American silent short Western film directed by Lorimer Johnston. The film stars Sydney Ayres, Perry Banks, Louise Lester, Jacques Jaccard, Jack Richardson, Vivian Rich, and Harry van Meter.

External links
 

1914 films
1914 Western (genre) films
American silent short films
American black-and-white films
Silent American Western (genre) films
Films directed by Lorimer Johnston
1910s American films
1910s English-language films
1914 short films